WTKR (channel 3) is a television station licensed to Norfolk, Virginia, United States, serving the Hampton Roads area as an affiliate of CBS. It is owned by E. W. Scripps Company alongside Portsmouth-licensed CW affiliate WGNT (channel 27). Both stations share studios on Boush Street near downtown Norfolk, while WTKR's transmitter is located in Suffolk, Virginia.

History

Early history
The station began operation on channel 4 on April 2, 1950, as WTAR-TV. It was Hampton Roads' first television station and the second television station in Virginia, after WTVR (channel 6) in Richmond. It carried programming from all four networks of the time—NBC, CBS, ABC, and DuMont—but was a primary NBC affiliate. In its first year of operation, when only 600 TV sets existed in the area, it had 19 locally originated programs in addition to network shows. Within a year of the station's debut, it moved into a new radio-TV center at 720 Boush Street.

It was owned by Norfolk Newspapers, publisher of The Virginian-Pilot and The Ledger-Star, along with WTAR radio (AM 790, now on AM 850), Virginia's first radio station, and WTAR-FM. It moved to channel 3 in 1952 in order to avoid interference with WNBW (now WRC-TV) in Washington, D.C. When WVEC-TV signed on a year later as an NBC affiliate, WTAR-TV became a primary CBS affiliate, retaining its secondary ABC and DuMont affiliations.

WTAR became solely affiliated with CBS in 1957, when WAVY-TV signed on as the ABC affiliate (WAVY and WVEC would swap affiliations in 1959 making the latter station the ABC affiliate). DuMont also shut down in 1956. In 1967, Norfolk Newspapers was reorganized as Landmark Communications, WTAR-AM-FM-TV became the flagship stations. The station was one of several in the country to produce a local version of PM Magazine from the late 1970s to mid-1980s.

The Federal Communications Commission (FCC) began tightening its ownership restrictions in the 1970s, eventually barring common ownership of newspapers and broadcasting outlets. Landmark was able to get grandfathered protection for its flagship Hampton Roads cluster. However, in 1981, it opted to sell channel 3 to Knight-Ridder, who changed the station's calls to WTKR on March 4. The new calls not only reflected the new ownership (FCC rules prohibited TV and radio stations in the same market, but with different ownership from sharing the same callsigns then, hence the modification), but also sounded similar to the old ones. Knight-Ridder sold WTKR and sister station WPRI-TV in Providence, Rhode Island to Narragansett Television in 1989. Narragansett sold WTKR to The New York Times Company in 1995.

Local TV and Tribune ownership
On May 7, 2007; the Times sold its entire broadcasting division, including WTKR, to Local TV. In June 2010, Local TV announced that it would be acquiring CW affiliate WGNT (channel 27) from CBS Corporation's Television stations group. WTKR managed the station through a time brokerage agreement from that point until Local TV closed on the purchase on August 4. This purchase created the market's second co-owned duopoly operation, after the LIN TV-owned combination of WAVY and Fox affiliate WVBT.

On July 1, 2013, Local TV announced that its 19 stations would be acquired by the Tribune Company, the owner of the Daily Press in Newport News, for $2.75 billion; Since this would conflict with FCC regulations that prohibit newspaper-television cross-ownership within a single market (although Tribune has maintained cross-ownership waivers for its newspaper-television station combinations in four other media markets), Tribune spun off WTKR and WGNT to Dreamcatcher Broadcasting, an unrelated company owned by former Tribune Company executive Ed Wilson. Tribune will provide services to the stations through a shared services agreement, and will hold an option to buy back WTKR and WGNT outright in the future. The sale was completed on December 27. Tribune later announced on July 10, 2013, that it would spin off its newspapers (including the Daily Press) into a separate company, the Tribune Publishing Company, in 2014, pending shareholder and regulatory approval.

Aborted sale to Sinclair Broadcast Group
On May 8, 2017, Hunt Valley, Maryland-based Sinclair Broadcast Group—which has owned MyNetworkTV affiliate WTVZ (channel 33) since 1996—entered into an agreement to acquire Tribune Media for $3.9 billion, plus the assumption of $2.7 billion in Tribune-held debt. While WTKR would not have been in conflict with existing FCC in-market ownership rules and could have been acquired by Sinclair in any event, the group was precluded from acquiring WGNT directly as broadcasters are not currently allowed to legally own more than two full-power television stations in a single market (both WTVZ-TV and WGNT rank below the ratings threshold that forbids common ownership of two of the four highest-rated stations by total day viewership in a single market). Given the group's tendency to use such agreements to circumvent FCC ownership rules, Sinclair could have opted to either take over the operations of WTKR/WGNT or transfer ownership of and retain operational responsibilities for WTVZ-TV through a local marketing agreement with one of its partner companies.

Less than one month after the FCC voted to have the deal reviewed by an administrative law judge amid "serious concerns" about Sinclair's forthrightness in its applications to sell certain conflict properties, on August 9, 2018, Tribune announced it would terminate the Sinclair deal, intending to seek other M&A opportunities. Tribune also filed a breach of contract lawsuit in the Delaware Chancery Court, alleging that Sinclair engaged in protracted negotiations with the FCC and the DOJ over regulatory issues, refused to sell stations in markets where it already had properties (such as KAUT-TV), and proposed divestitures to parties with ties to Sinclair executive chair David D. Smith that were rejected or highly subject to rejection to maintain control over stations it was required to sell.

Sale to Nexstar Media Group and resale to Scripps
On December 3, 2018, Irving, Texas–based Nexstar Media Group—which has owned WAVY-TV and Fox affiliate WVBT (channel 43) since January 2017—announced it would acquire the assets of Tribune Media for $6.4 billion in cash and debt. Nexstar was precluded from acquiring WTKR/WGNT directly or indirectly while owning WAVY/WVBT, as FCC regulations prohibit common ownership of more than two stations in the same media market, or two or more of the four highest-rated stations in the market. (WAVY and WTKR consistently rank among the top four in terms of total-day viewership in the Norfolk–Virginia Beach–Hampton Roads market, while WVBT and WGNT have occasionally rotated between fourth and fifth place, a situation that allowed for Media General and, later, Nexstar to acquire WVBT directly in their respective group acquisitions involving the WAVY/WVBT duopoly. Furthermore, any attempt by Nexstar to assume the operations of WTKR/WGNT through local marketing or shared services agreements would have been subject to regulatory hurdles that could have delayed completion of the FCC and Justice Department's review and approval process for the acquisition.) As such, on January 31, 2019, Nexstar announced that WTKR and WGNT, along with WNEP-TV in Scranton, Pennsylvania would be sold to independent third parties in order to address ownership conflicts involving existing Nexstar properties in both markets. On March 20, 2019, the Cincinnati-based E. W. Scripps Company announced it would purchase WTKR and WGNT from Nexstar upon consummation of the merger, marking Scripps' entry into Virginia, as part of the company's sale of nineteen Nexstar- and Tribune-operated stations to Scripps and Tegna Inc. in separate deals worth $1.32 billion. The sale was approved by the FCC on September 16 and was completed on September 19.

News operation
Not surprisingly for a station with roots in a newspaper, channel 3 dominated the news ratings in Hampton Roads for most of its first four decades on the air. However, its ratings slipped after a botched relaunch in 1994. The station has mostly recovered, and now frequently trades the ratings lead with WAVY. WTKR won the noon, 4 p.m., 7 p.m. and 11 p.m. timeslots in May 2019.

Over the years, the station expanded its news operation to include about 30 hours of local news production per week. During the 2009 NCAA Division I men's basketball tournament, independent station WSKY-TV aired two weeknight 11 o'clock newscasts from WTKR. WTKR did air late newscasts at midnight when the coverage concluded.

WTKR started the area's first 4 p.m. newscast on September 8, 2009. This is the station's second attempt at a newscast during the 4 p.m. hour, as WTKR had aired a short-lived 4:30 p.m. newscast in 1995.

WTKR began producing and airing its local newscasts in high definition on January 26, 2009, with the 5:00 p.m. broadcast. WTKR is the third station in the Hampton Roads market, after WAVY-TV and WVBT, to begin airing high definition newscasts (as opposed to the upconverted widescreen standard definition format of WVEC's newscasts).

As of August 25, 2011, a two-hour extension of WTKR's weekday morning newscast airs from 7 to 9 a.m. on sister station WGNT. On July 7, 2014, a half-hour 7 p.m. newscast made its debut on WGNT featuring former morning anchor Laila Muhammad, Les Smith and chief meteorologist Patrick Rockey. It is the first and only newscast at that time slot in the Hampton Roads area. Almost a year later, a weeknight 10 p.m. newscast returned to WGNT after 18 years under the name WGNT News at 10 - Powered by NewsChannel 3 on June 29, 2015. This was not the first attempt at a weeknight 10 p.m. newscast for the station; a previous incarnation ran from 1995 to 1997 (as NewsChannel 3 at 10:00 on UPN 27) when WGNT was a UPN affiliate.

On June 17, 2016, WTKR retired the NewsChannel 3 branding it had used since 1995, returning to the News 3 moniker it used from 1970 to 1992.

Notable former on-air staff
Ed Hughes, often called the Walter Cronkite of Hampton Roads, from 1967 (as WTAR) to his death from cancer in 2004.
Bob McAllister, worked as host on WTAR during the 1950s; later host of Wonderama on WNEW, died in 1998.
Paula Miller, reporter from 1984 until 1999; later a member of the Virginia House of Delegates.
Judi Moen, reporter during mid-1990s. Previously at WBBM-TV from 1981 until 1994. Later a host on the Travel Channel. Now working as advocate for the disabled.
Bob Rathbun, sports anchor from 1990 until 1991. Previously at WTAR Radio for 12 years. Now play-by-play announcer for the Atlanta Hawks.
Lyn Vaughn, evening anchor from 1999 until 2001. Previously with Headline News from 1984 until 1997.
Jim Vicevich, economics reporter until 1980. Now a Connecticut radio talk-show host
William Whitehurst, reporter for WTAR from 1950 until 1968, served in United States House of Representatives from 1969 to 1987; later an occasional analyst for WTKR and serves on Old Dominion University faculty

Technical information

Subchannels
The station's digital signal is multiplexed:

On December 6, 2014, WTKR added its first digital subchannel. This TV, a diginet then co-owned by Tribune Media, was placed on virtual channel 3.2.

Analog-to-digital conversion
WTKR began digital broadcasts on channel 40 on March 11, 2002, at 4:15 p.m. The station discontinued regular programming on its analog signal, over VHF channel 3, on June 12, 2009, as part of the federally mandated from analog to digital television. The station's digital signal remained on its pre-transition UHF channel 40, using PSIP to display WTKR's virtual channel as 3 on digital television receivers.

The station frequency transitioned to channel 16 on July 2, 2020.

Eastern Shore translator
There is one low-powered translator of WTKR on the Eastern Shore of Virginia, W18EG-D in Onancock. It is owned by the Accomack County government rather than Scripps. WTKR and Scripps do not own any translators located in the Greater Hampton Roads area.

References

External links

CBS network affiliates
Court TV affiliates
Bounce TV affiliates
Circle (TV network) affiliates
Television channels and stations established in 1950
1950 establishments in Virginia
TKR
E. W. Scripps Company television stations
Norfolk, Virginia